HMAT Bulla was laid down as SS Hessen for the German Line Norddeutscher Lloyd in 1905. It was seized by Australian forces on September 3, 1914, when it sailed into Melbourne, being unaware of the outbreak of World War I and used as a troop transport during the First World War before being transferred to the Commonwealth Government Line of Steamers in 1918. It was sold in 1926 to W. Schuchmann, and again renamed as Weissesee

Weissesee was bombed and sunk by aircraft at Hamburg, Germany, on 25 July 1943. The wreck was raised in 1949 and scrapped.

References

1905 ships
Ships built in Bremen (state)
Steamships of Germany
World War I merchant ships of Germany
Captured ships
Troop ships of Australia
World War II merchant ships of Germany
Merchant ships sunk by aircraft
Maritime incidents in July 1943